Glen Rose may refer to:

People
Glen Rose (1905–1994), sportsman

Places
 United States
Glen Rose, Arkansas
Glen Rose, Texas

Geology
Glen Rose Formation, geologic unit in Texas